Í Fløtugerði is a football stadium in Fuglafjørður, Faroe Islands. It is currently the home ground of ÍF Fuglafjørður.

Its capacity is 1,200, including 360 seats.

History
On 15 November 1940, ÍF began purchasing land in northern part of Fuglafjørður. In the following years, the club obtained funding from the municipality and loans, which has resulted in official opening of the stadium in 1956.

On 12 August 1979, the record attendance was set. Over 1,500 people gathered around the stadium to watch the match between ÍF and TB Tvøroyri. The hosts won 3–1.

Í Fløtugerði has hosted the Faroe Islands Cup final on 29 September 1985. GÍ Gøta won 4–2 against NSÍ Runavík, thus winning its second cup trophy.

The stadium was renovated in 2008.

References

External links
Pictures from Europlan.de
Profile at StadiumDB

Football venues in the Faroe Islands
Sport in Fuglafjørður
ÍF Fuglafjørður